Bas Veth (12 March 1861 – 4 April 1944) was a Dutch painter. His work was part of the painting event in the art competition at the 1924 Summer Olympics.

References

1861 births
1944 deaths
19th-century Dutch painters
20th-century Dutch painters
Dutch male painters
Olympic competitors in art competitions
People from Arnhem
19th-century Dutch male artists
20th-century Dutch male artists